Melodi Grand Prix Junior 2002 was the first ever music competition in Norway in the series Melodi Grand Prix Junior for children between the ages of 8 and 15. The winners were To små karer (meaning two little guys) with the song "Paybacktime". They represented Norway in MGP Nordic (Melodi Grand Prix Nordic 2002) held in Denmark together with the second-placed Wicked Instinct and third-placed Black Jackets. Program presenter was Thomas Numme, while Stian Barsnes Simonsen was backstage.

There were 10 participants, including three bands, three girl groups, three solo artists and one duo.

The album Melodi Grand Prix Junior 2002 containing the songs of the 10 finalists reached #4 on the VG-lista Norwegian Albums Chart on weeks 10 and 11 of 2002 staying at #4, with the album staying a total of 10 weeks in the charts.

Results

References

External links
MGP juniors official website

Melodi Grand Prix Junior
Music festivals in Norway